E. L. Gray House is a historic cure cottage located at Saranac Lake in the town of Harrietstown, Franklin County, New York.  It was built in 1911–1913 and is a -story, rectangular frame structure with a concrete block foundation and steeply pitched, multi-planed roof in the Shingle style.

It was listed on the National Register of Historic Places in 1992.

References

Houses on the National Register of Historic Places in New York (state)
Houses completed in 1913
Shingle Style houses
Houses in Franklin County, New York
1913 establishments in New York (state)
National Register of Historic Places in Franklin County, New York
Shingle Style architecture in New York (state)